Ngaikhong Khullen is a large village located in Bishnupur district, Manipur, India, with a total of 1084 families residing.

Demographics
The village has a population of 5256, of which 2656 are male and 2600 are female, as per Population Census 2011.

The population of the children of age group 0-6 is 661, 12.58% of the total. The Average Sex Ratio is 979 which is lower than the Manipur state average of 985. The Child Sex Ratio per the census is 927, lower than the Manipur average of 930. The village has a higher literacy rate than Manipur. In 2011, the literacy rate of Ngaikhong Khullen village was 78.11% as compared to 76.94% of Manipur. In Ngaikhong Khullen male literacy stood at 89.49% while female literacy rate was 66.56%.

As per the constitution of India and Panchyati Raaj Act, the village is administrated by Sarpanch (Head of Village) who is the elected representative of the village.

Ngaikhong  Khullen  Data

 
source Census 2011

Administration
Ngaikhong Khullen is divided into 9 wards and each ward is represented by a Ward Member, also referred to as a Panch, who is directly elected by the villagers. The Ngaikhong Khullen Gram Panchayat is chaired by the president of the village, known as a Sarpanch. The term of the elected representatives is of five years. The Secretary of the panchayat is a non-elected representative, appointed by the state government of Manipur, to oversee the panchayat activities.

References

Villages in Bishnupur district